Personal Computer Magazine, PCMagazine or PCM is a Dutch monthly magazine about personal computers

The first edition of PCM was issued in October 1983 by VNU Business Publications. Since November 2007 PCM is published by HUB Uitgevers. The magazine appears in a circulation of roughly  50.000 copies per month. The magazine is aimed at the beginning hobbyist and home user as well as experienced and business users. Generally the magazine covers Windows more than other platforms.

See also
Computer!Totaal

External links
 

1983 establishments in the Netherlands
Monthly magazines published in the Netherlands
Computer magazines published in the Netherlands
Magazines established in 1983
Magazines published in Amsterdam